Robert Sweet (1783–20 January 1835) was an English botanist, horticulturist and ornithologist.

Born at Cockington near Torquay, Devonshire, England in 1783, Sweet worked as a gardener from the age of sixteen, and became foreman or partner in a series of nurseries.  He was associated with nurseries at Stockwell, Fulham and Chelsea. In 1812 he joined Colvills, the famous Chelsea nursery, and was elected a fellow of the Linnean Society. By 1818 he was publishing horticultural and botanical works.

He published a number of illustrated works on plants cultivated in British gardens and hothouses. The plates were mainly drawn by Edwin Dalton Smith (1800–1883), a botanical artist, who was attached to the Royal Botanic Gardens, Kew.  His works include Hortus Suburbanus Londinensis (1818), Geraniaceae (five volumes) (1820–30), Cistineae, Sweet's Hortus Britannicus (1826–27), Flora Australasica (1827–28) and British Botany (with H. Weddell) (1831).  He died at Chelsea, London in January 1835.

He was charged with receiving a batch of plants allegedly stolen from the Royal Botanic Gardens at Kew. It was suggested that this was an attempt to frame him by an official at Kew whom Sweet had criticised. He was acquitted after a well-publicised trial.

Robert Sweet received high praise from his contemporaries at his trial and was described as possibly the first practical botanist.

Publications

British Warblers

Sweet is the author of a number of plants, including:

 Abutilon auritum (Link) Sweet
 Abutilon grandifolium (Willd.) Sweet
 Abutilon indicum (Link) Sweet – Indian lantern flower 
 Acacia leucolobia Sweet
 Agonis flexuosa (Willd.) Sweet – Peppermint
 Argemone ochroleuca Sweet – Mexican poppy
 Babiana angustifolia Sweet
 Banksia dryandroides Sweet – Dryandra-leaved Banksia
 Callistemon glaucus (Bonpl.) Sweet 
 Coreopsis grandiflora Sweet – American tickseed
 Cyanotis axillaris (L.) Sweet
 Dillwynia pungens (Sweet) Benth.
 Hakea ferruginea Sweet
 Hovea chorizemifolia (Sweet) DC. – Holly-leaved Hovea
 Ipomoea cairica (L.) Sweet – Coast morning glory
 Lablab purpureus (L.) Sweet – Lablab bean 
 Lachenalia mutabilis Sweet
 Moraea flaccida Sweet – One-leaf cape tulip
 Orthrosanthus multiflorus Sweet – Morning Iris
 Penaeaceae Sweet ex Guillemin
 Senna barclayana (Sweet) Randell
 Sphenotoma gracile (R.Br.) Sweet – Swamp paper-heath
 Wahlenbergia stricta (R.Br.) Sweet – Austral bluebell

Notes

References

External links
 University of Delaware Library

English botanists
English gardeners
English ornithologists
Fellows of the Linnean Society of London
1783 births
1835 deaths